Sean Jackson may refer to:

Sean Jackson (Scottish musician)
Sean C. Jackson, maze artist 
Sean Jackson, a basketball player on the 1991–92 Princeton Tigers men's basketball team
Sean Jackson, an American football player in the 1993 Orange Bowl
Sean Jackson, an actor in the audio drama The Healers
Shaun Jackson, a character in the British television series Holby City

See also
DeSean Jackson (born 1986), American football player